Kharagdiha is a village in the Jamua CD block in the Khori Mahua subdivision of the Giridih district in the Indian state of Jharkhand. It had been known as Curruckdea or Curruckdeah during the British Raj.

Geography

Location

Area overview
Giridih district is a part of the Chota Nagpur plateau, with rocky soil and extensive forests. Most of the rivers in the district flow from the west to east, except in the northern portion where the rivers flow north and north west. The district has coal and mica mines. It is an overwhelmingly rural district with small pockets of urbanisation. 

Note: The map alongside presents some of the notable locations in the district. All places marked in the map are linked in the larger full screen map.

History

Kharagdiha estate was founded in 15th century when the then Maharaja was able to influence and impress the ghatwals of Kharagdiha Gadis. The Hazaribagh Gazetteer describes this kingdom 600 miles long which spread  from Hazaribagh to Gaya. The Kharagdiha gadis were semi-independent chiefdoms. All that the ruler of the Gadi had to do on succession was to acknowledge the supremacy of the Kharagdiha Maharaja. Koderma,  Gadi Palganj, Ledo Gadi, Ghoranji Gadi and Gadi Sirsia were notable gadis. There were a total of 38 Gadis in the kingdom. 

During the British Raj Kharagdiha became a part of Jungle Terry. The Gadis of Kharagdiha were permanently settled and they became Zamindari estates. The rulers of Kharagdiha were separately settled the zamindari estate of Raj Dhanwar in 1809.

Subsequent to the Kol uprising in 1831 that, did not seriously affect Hazaribag, however, the administrative structure of the territory was changed. The parganas of Ramgarh, Kharagdiha, Kendi and Kunda became parts of the South-West Frontier Agency and were formed into a division named Hazaribag as the administrative headquarters.

In 1854, the designation of South-West Frontier Agency was changed to Chota Nagpur Division and it began to be administered as a Non-regulation province under the Lieutenant Governor of the then Bihar. In 1855-56 there was the great uprising of the Santhals against the British but was brutally suppressed.

Places of interest
The Langta Baba Samadhi Sthal is located in Kharagdiha, about 30 km northwest of the town on the road towards Jamua. Langta Baba is revered by both Hindus and Muslims alike. People offer chaadars (shawls and blankets) to his samadhi as a ritual, and it is believed that the wish made here by a true devotee always gets fulfilled.

References

Giridih district